William Burns Lindsay may refer to:
 William Burns Lindsay Jr. (1824–1872), Clerk of the Legislative Assembly of the Province of Canada and the first Clerk of the House of Commons of Canada
 William Burns Lindsay Sr. (1796–1862), Clerk of the Legislative Assembly of Lower Canada and the Legislative Assembly of the Province of Canada

Human name disambiguation pages